Dire Dawa Stadium is a multi-purpose stadium in Dire Dawa, Ethiopia.  It is currently used mostly for football matches, on club level by Dire Dawa City of the Ethiopian Premier League. The stadium has a capacity of 18,000 spectators.

History 
The stadium hosted six matches during the 1976 African Cup of Nations hosted by Ethiopia. 

In 2018, the stadium under went renovation work after the conclusion of Dire Dawa City's 2017-18 season. The renovation included an overhaul of the main pitch surface. Starting on April 7, 2021, the stadium hosted the third round of matches of the 2020-21 Ethiopian Premier League.

References

Multi-purpose stadiums in Ethiopia
Football venues in Ethiopia
Dire Dawa City S.C.